"Because of You" is a song by Canadian rock band Nickelback. It was released in September 2004 as the fourth single from their 2003 album The Long Road. The song was included in the MX vs. ATV Unleashed soundtrack.

Charts

Track listing 
 "Because of You""

References

2003 songs
2004 singles
Nickelback songs
Songs written by Chad Kroeger
Songs written by Ryan Peake
Songs written by Mike Kroeger
Roadrunner Records singles